Maria Vladimirovna of Staritsa (c. 1560 in Staritsa – 13 May 1610) was a Russian princess. She was the daughter of Prince Vladimir of Staritsa and his wife, Princess Eudoxia Romanovna Odoevskaya, and, through her father, descended from Sophia Palaiologina.

On 12 April 1574, in Novgorod, she married Magnus of Livonia.  They had two children: 
 Maria of Oldenburg (July 1580 – 1597).
 Eudoxia of Oldenburg (January 1581 – 18 March 1589).

Upon her husband's death, Jerome Horsey escorted Maria from the Bishopric of Courland to the court of Boris Godunov. Although Horsey proposed to marry her, Godunov was anxious to get rid of a potential claimant to the throne. As a result, Maria was forced to take the veil and entered a convent adjacent to the Troitse-Sergiyeva Lavra.

In 1609, she entered into correspondence with her false cousin, False Dmitry II, who had proclaimed himself Tsar. Her subsequent fate is not documented.

References

External links 

1560s births
1610s deaths
Tsardom of Russia people
Queens consort
16th-century Russian people
17th-century Russian people
Year of birth uncertain
People of Byzantine descent
Tsardom of Russia nuns
16th-century Russian women
17th-century Russian women
Rurik dynasty